Francesco Fortunato (born 13 December 1994) is an Italian male racewalker, which participated at the 2017 World Championships in Athletics. He competed at the 2020 Summer Olympics, in 20 km walk.

Achievements

National titles
He won 11 national championships at senior level.

Italian Athletics Championships
 10 km walk: 2016, 2020, 2021 (3)
20 km walk: 2017, 2019 (2)
Italian Indoor Athletics Championships
5000 metres walk: 2016, 2017, 2018, 2019, 2020, 2023 (6)

References

External links
 
 Francesco Fortunato at Marciadalmondo.com 

1994 births
Living people
Italian male racewalkers
World Athletics Championships athletes for Italy
Athletics competitors of Fiamme Gialle
Italian Athletics Championships winners
Athletes (track and field) at the 2020 Summer Olympics
Olympic athletes of Italy
21st-century Italian people